Boris Tokarev  may refer to:

 Boris Tokarev (athlete) (1927–2002), Russian athlete
 Boris Tokarev (actor) (born 1947), Russian actor